Henry Frank Johnson (17 December 1834 – 7 December 1908) was a bishop in the Church of England from 1895.

He was born 17 December 1834, youngest son of Colonel John Johnson of Walbury, Great Hallingbury. Educated at Eton and Trinity College, Cambridge, from 1856 to 1858 he was a cornet in the Royal Dragoons after which he studied for ordination at Wells Theological College. Following curacies at Richmond, Surrey and Sawbridgeworth, he was the first vicar of High Wych and then rector of Chelmsford. After this he was Archdeacon of Essex, before being appointed Bishop of Colchester in 1895. He remained Bishop of Colchester until his death in 1908. He was buried at High Wych.

In December 1901 he was appointed honorary chaplain to the Essex Imperial Yeomanry.

References

 

1834 births
1908 deaths
People educated at Eton College
Alumni of Trinity College, Cambridge
1st The Royal Dragoons officers
Essex Yeomanry officers
Archdeacons of Essex
Bishops of Colchester
20th-century Church of England bishops
19th-century Church of England bishops